Salton Sea (also known as Desert Shores) is a 2018 American independent film directed by Michael Stevantoni and based on George McCormick's 2012 short story Collection Salton Sea. The film was shot at the Salton Sea, and the town Desert Shores, California.

The film was released on streaming and Blu-ray by Cinema Epoch on July 1, 2019.

Synopsis
Hoping to convince his wife that a promotion across the country could change their lives, Brian takes her on a trip to a faded resort town where they once honeymooned. Here, Brian is forced to examine his own marriage, fears, and integrity.

Cast 
 Joel Bissonnette as Brian
 Keylor Leigh as Ramona
 Olivia May as Annie

Reception 
The film premiered at the Blow-Up Chicago International Arthouse Film Festival where it won the Stanley Kubrick Award for Best Feature (USA) and Best Actor for Joel Bissonnette. The film also won Best Feature at the Nacogdoches Film Festival  and the ABQ Indie Fest, while also receiving nominations at the Milan International Film Festival for Best Movie, Best Actor (Bissonnette) and Best Supporting Actress (Leigh).

References

External links 
 

American independent films
Films set in California
Films shot in California
Films based on short fiction
2018 films
2010s English-language films
2010s American films